Mossi is an Italian surname that may refer to the following notable people:
Anthony Mossi (born 1994), French football goalkeeper
Dante Mossi, Honduran economist, international civil servant and diplomat
Don Mossi (1929–2019), American baseball player
Giovanni Mossi (c.1680–1742), Italian composer
Juma Mossi (born 1973), Burundian football player
Luigi De Mossi (born 1960), Italian politician and lawyer

Italian-language surnames